Kajihara (written: 梶原 or 加治原) is a Japanese surname. Notable people with the surname include:

, Japanese rugby union player
, Japanese fencer
, Japanese cyclist
, Japanese actor

Japanese-language surnames